David Moniac (December 1802 – November 21, 1836), an American military officer, was the first Native American graduate of the United States Military Academy at West Point, New York in 1822. A Creek with some Scots ancestry, who was related to major Creek leaders on both sides of his family, Moniac was the first cadet to enter West Point from the new state of Alabama. Moniac resigned his commission in 1822 to manage his clan's property in Alabama, where he developed a cotton plantation.

In 1836, during the Second Seminole War, Moniac was commissioned as a captain and selected to command a Creek volunteer cavalry unit, the only Native American among the officers. He was killed at the Battle of Wahoo Swamp. In the 1990s, his remains were transferred from a local cemetery to the newly established Florida National Cemetery for military veterans, a few miles away.

Early life and education
David A. Moniac, as his name was sometimes recorded, was the son of the prosperous Creek merchant Samuel Moniac and Elizabeth Weatherford, both mixed-race Creek. His mother was the sister of the Creek leader William Weatherford, and his great-uncle was Alexander McGillivray, an important Creek chief on his mother's side. The Creek had a matrilineal kinship system, so Moniac was considered to be born into his mother's Wind Clan and gained his social status there. Moniac's maternal uncle would have been more important to his upbringing than his father. The Moniac family lived in present-day Montgomery County, Alabama, near the unincorporated community of Pintlala. His father served with the U.S. forces in the Creek War, as he was allied with the Lower Creek who were more assimilated. They defeated the Red Sticks.

At this time, the United States was encouraging assimilation of the Creek and other tribes of the Southeast to European-American ways. They became known as the Five Civilized Tribes, for they adopted many aspects of U.S. culture. 

The Fort Jackson Treaty, which concluded the Creek War, included a provision for the education of the Creek people. His father's military service, most likely enabled Moniac to get an appointment in 1817 to the U.S. Military Academy, located in New York. No doubt a role was played by John Crowell, Alabama's first member of the House of Representatives and after that, Indian agent to the Creeks (which usually meant a Creek wife; white husbands were coveted). Before starting there, Moniac studied with John McLeod, a tutor in Washington, D.C, to prepare for the entrance exam and classes. At his request, he repeated a year of college; he graduated 39 out of 40 in 1822, although the 40 were the survivors of an entering class of 117.

Moniac served for five months as a Brevet Second Lieutenant in the Sixth Infantry, but resigned his commission on December 31, 1822. President Madison was encouraging Army officers to resign, as in 1821, the War of 1812 and First Seminole Wars over, Congress had cut the size of the Army and West Point was graduating more officers than the Army could use. He returned to Alabama to deal with clan property.

Return to Alabama
Moniac returned to Alabama, where he settled in Baldwin County. He developed a cotton plantation and bred thoroughbred race horses. He married Mary Powell, a Creek who was a cousin of the Seminole leader Osceola. Among their children was a son, David A. Moniac, who served as sheriff of Baldwin County, where the Moniac descendants stayed. Sheriff Moniac is buried in the Old Methodist Church in Daphne, Alabama. The plantation home, built in the 1830s, still stands today. It may be the oldest house in Baldwin County. It is located on Gantt Road in Little River, Alabama.
Edit added 6/7/2022 - About 3 years ago the home burned. There is nothing but a few brick pillars left that supported the home.

Second Seminole War
Fourteen years after he graduated from West Point, with the outbreak of the Second Seminole War in 1836, Moniac was called twice into service: he first served with the Alabama militia to suppress an uprising of displaced Creek. Indian removal had started in the Southeast, as tribes were relocated to Indian Territory west of the Mississippi River.

In August 1836, Moniac was commissioned as a captain of the Creek Mounted Volunteer Regiment. It was a volunteer unit of Creek warriors led by white officers on leave from regular units. He was the only Native American officer in the unit. The regiment patrolled and skirmished with the Seminole in Florida along the Withlacoochee River. He was promoted to major in November.

That month, Territorial Governor Richard K. Call took a force of 2500 regular soldiers, Moniac and his Creek volunteers, and Tennessee and Florida militia from Ft. Drane, to the Wahoo Swamp on the Withlacoochee River. They were to find and destroy the stronghold of Seminole Chief Jumper. In what would become known as the Battle of Wahoo Swamp, Call's force attacked an estimated mixed force of 600 Seminole and African-American warriors, who were defending their families. The deep water blocked the American force. Moniac ran ahead into the water to encourage his men to cross. He was shot dead by the Seminoles.

General Call called off the attack after taking fierce fire from the Seminole camp, and being unsure if the water was fordable. The American dead from the battle were buried near those killed the previous December in 1835 at the nearby Dade's Massacre site, where the Seminole defeated U.S. Army forces. Later all the bodies were moved for burial at the St. Augustine National Cemetery.

Honors
In the 1990s, Major Moniac's remains were transferred and reinterred in the Florida National Cemetery, as a recognition of his military service. The new cemetery was established a few miles from the Wahoo Swamp Battlefield.

References

Further reading
Griffin, Benjamin. "Lt. David Moniac, Creek Indian: First Minority Graduate of West Point." Alabama Historical Quarterly 2 (Summer 1981): 99–110.
Mahon, John K. (1991) "History of the Second Seminole War 1835-1842" Revised Edition. University Presses of Florida/Gainesville. ISBN 0-8130-1097-7.
Sprague, John T, Brevet Captain, 8th Regt US Inf. (2000) "The Florida War."  A reproduction of the 1848 edition.  University of Tampa Press; ISBN 1-879852-69-1.

External links
"Service Profile: David Moniac", Gazetteer

1802 births
1836 deaths
United States Military Academy alumni
Muscogee people
American people of the Seminole Wars
American military personnel killed in the American Indian Wars
Native Americans of the Seminole Wars
Native American United States military personnel
Burials at Florida National Cemetery
People from Montgomery County, Alabama